The 1980 Italian Indoor Open, also known as the Bologna Open or Bologna Indoor, was a men's tennis tournament played on indoor carpet courts that was part of the 1980 Volvo Grand Prix circuit and took place in Bologna, Italy. It was the sixth edition of the tournament and was held from 17 November through 23 November 1980. Fifth-seeded Tomáš Šmíd won the singles title.

Finals

Singles
 Tomáš Šmíd defeated  Paolo Bertolucci 6–3, 6–2
 It was Šmíd's 2nd and last singles title of the year and the 4th of his career.

Doubles
 Balázs Taróczy /  Butch Walts defeated  Steve Denton /  Paul McNamee 2–6, 6–3, 6–0

References

External links
 ATP tournament profile
 ITF tournament edition details

Italian Indoor Open
Italian Indoor Open
Italian Indoor Open
November 1980 sports events in Europe